Valeri Vladimirovich Korneyev (born 12 March 1962) is a Russian professional football coach and a former player.

Club career
He made his professional debut in the Soviet Second League in 1979 for FC Dynamo Bryansk.

Post-playing career
On 15 January 2021, he was banned from any football activity for life after FC Dynamo Bryansk fielded 3 players who tested positive for COVID-19 in a league game and submitted fake negative test results to the league.

References

1962 births
Sportspeople from Bryansk
Living people
Soviet footballers
Russian footballers
Association football forwards
FC Dynamo Bryansk players
FC Dynamo Stavropol players
FC Shakhtar Donetsk players
FC Spartak Vladikavkaz players
PFC Marek Dupnitsa players
FC Kuban Krasnodar players
PFC Krylia Sovetov Samara players
FC Saturn Ramenskoye players
FC SKA-Khabarovsk players
Soviet Top League players
Russian Premier League players
Russian expatriate footballers
Expatriate footballers in Bulgaria
Russian football managers